General Sir Percy Pollexfen de Blaquiere Radcliffe  (9 February 1874 – 9 February 1934) was a British Army officer who reached high office in the 1930s.

Military career

Percy Radcliffe was commissioned into the Royal Artillery in 1893. He saw service with 'G' Battery, Royal Horse Artillery in the Second Boer War between 1899 and 1900, and was mentioned in dispatches, and was promoted to captain in 1900 and then to major in 1910.  He saw active service during World War I on the Western Front, and was made lieutenant colonel in 1916 and a brevet colonel the following year.  He was mentioned in dispatches six times during World War I.  When William Robertson was replaced as CIGS in early 1918 by Sir Henry Wilson, Radcliffe was appointed Director of Military Operations at the War Office. He replaced Major-General Frederick Maurice.  Radcliffe continued as DMO from 1918 until 1922. He was appointed General Officer Commanding 48th (South Midland) Division in 1923, General Officer Commanding 4th Division in 1926 and General Officer Commanding-in-Chief of Scottish Command in 1930. His final appointment was as General Officer Commanding-in-Chief of Southern Command from 1933 until his death, when he fell from a horse and had a heart attack, on his sixtieth birthday, in 1934.

Personal life
He was born on 9 February 1874.  His parents were W. Pollexfen Radcliffe and Isabel de Blaquiere.  He was educated at Winchester College and the Royal Military Academy. He married twice - first to Rahmeh Theodora Swinburne in 1918 and then to Florence Alice Coromandel Tagg in 1932.

Works
 Tactical Employment of Field Artillery (which he translated from the French).
 Report on the Franco-British Mission to Poland, July, August 1920

References

|-

|-
 

|-
 

1874 births
1934 deaths
Royal Artillery officers
British Army personnel of the Second Boer War
British Army generals of World War I
Knights Commander of the Order of the Bath
Knights Commander of the Order of St Michael and St George
Companions of the Distinguished Service Order
British Army generals